Gilbert Henry Chandos Leigh, DL, JP (1 September 1851 – 15 September 1884) was a British Liberal Party politician.

Background and education
Leigh was the eldest son and heir apparent of William Leigh, 2nd Baron Leigh, and Lady Caroline Amelia Grosvenor, daughter of Richard Grosvenor, 2nd Marquess of Westminster. He was educated at Harrow and Magdalene College, Cambridge.

Political career
Leigh entered Parliament for Warwickshire South in the 1880 general election, a seat he held until his death four years later. He also served as a Deputy Lieutenant and Justice of the Peace for Warwickshire.

Personal life
Leigh died in a hunting accident on a shooting expedition in the Big Horn Mountains Wyoming, United States, in September 1884, aged 33, (his body having to be retrieved from the bottom of a canyon), predeceasing his father by 21 years. He was unmarried and childless. He left an estate of £3,718 7s. 8d. His younger brother Francis later succeeded in the barony.

References

worldroots.com

External links 
 

1851 births
1884 deaths
People educated at Harrow School
Alumni of Magdalene College, Cambridge
Liberal Party (UK) MPs for English constituencies
UK MPs 1880–1885
Accidental deaths in Wyoming
Hunting accident deaths
Deputy Lieutenants of Warwickshire
Heirs apparent who never acceded
Eldest sons of British hereditary barons
People from Warwick District